Madapelmus is a genus of beetles in the family Carabidae, containing the following species:

 Madapelmus elongatus Dajoz, 1985
 Madapelmus parrottii Baehr, 2007

References

Pterostichinae